The 2011-12 season will be the 39th season for Roda JC competing in the Dutch Eredivisie. This article will show statistics and list details of all matches played by the club during the season.

Club

Team kit
Diadora will be supplying the team kits for another season. Accon-avm is the shirt sponsor for the second season on a row.

Coaching staff

Statistics

Appearances and goals
Last updated on 23 October 2011.

|-
|colspan="14"|Players no longer at the club:

|}

Top scorers

Cards
Accounts for all competitions. Last updated on 23 October 2011.

Starting formations
Accounts for all competitions. Last updated on 23 October 2011.

Starting XI
These are the most used starting players (Eredivisie only) in the most used formation throughout the complete season. Last updated on 23 October 2011.

Transfers

In

Out

Loans in

Loans out

Competitions

Pre-season

Eredivisie

League table

Results summary

Matches

KNVB Cup

References

2011-12
Roda JC Kerkrade